The Fortieaceae is a family of cyanobacteria.

References

Nostocales
Cyanobacteria families